Estefan Cortes-Vargas (born Estefania Cortes-Vargas, 1991) is a Colombian-born Canadian politician and non-profit administrator who was elected in the 2015 Alberta general election to the Legislative Assembly of Alberta, representing the electoral district of Strathcona-Sherwood Park as a member of the Alberta New Democratic Party. Upon election, they became one of the first three out LGBT people elected to the Alberta legislature, alongside caucus colleagues Michael Connolly and Ricardo Miranda.

Although Cortes-Vargas was represented in media coverage during the election campaign as female and lesbian, in December 2015, they formally came out as non-binary in the legislature during debate on the inclusion of transgender rights in the provincial human rights code. While the provincial Hansard normally reports members' speeches under the gender honorifics "Mr." or "Ms.", Cortes-Vargas was recorded as "Member Cortes-Vargas". They chose not to run in the 2019 Alberta general election.

In 2019, Cortes-Vargas was named executive director of the Pride Centre of Edmonton. They remained in that role until July 2020 when they became the new executive director for OUTSaskatoon. They have been the vice-president of the Enchanté Network, which is a coalition of 2SLGBTQ+ community organizations across Canada, since 2020. In September 2022, they started their studies to become a lawyer at the University of Saskatchewan College of Law in Saskatoon.

Electoral history

2015 general election

References

Alberta New Democratic Party MLAs
Canadian LGBT people in provincial and territorial legislatures
Colombian LGBT politicians
Transgender non-binary people
Living people
1990s births
21st-century Canadian politicians
Non-binary politicians
21st-century Canadian LGBT people